The Little Dragons (also known as Karate Kids U.S.A. or simply Karate Kids) is a 1980 American action adventure film about two young brothers who use their karate skills to rescue a friend after she is held captive for ransom. The film was directed and co-produced by Curtis Hanson. It stars Charles Lane, Ann Sothern, Chris Petersen and Pat Petersen.

Synopsis
Brothers, Zack and Woody (portrayed by real-life brothers Chris and Pat Petersen) are young karate students who embark on a weekend camping trip with their grandfather J.J. (Charles Lane).  Along the way they meet a new friend, Carol Forbinger (Sally Boyden) and her parents (Rick Lenz and Sharon Clark).  When the Forbinger family encounters a tough-talking backwoods mother (Ann Sothern) and her two bumbling sons (Joe Spinell and John Davis Chandler) who decide to hold Carol captive believing they can collect a sizeable ransom, the "karate kids" must find a way to use their martial arts skills to rescue the Forbinger girl with a little help from their grandfather and some new friends they meet along the way.

Cast 

Charles Lane as J.J.
Ann Sothern as Angel
Chris Petersen as Zack
Pat Petersen as Woody
Sally Boyden as Carol Forbinger
Rick Lenz as Dick Forbinger
Sharon Clark as Ruth Forbinger
Joe Spinell as Yancey
John Davis Chandler as Carl
Clifford A. Pellow as Sheriff
Stephen Young as Lunsford
Pat E. Johnson as Karate Instructor
Bong Soo Han as Karate Master
Donnie Williams as Motorcycle Leader
Tony Bill as Niles
Brad Gorman as Deputy
Tom Kibbe as FBI Van Operator
Spencer Quinn as Hootenanny M.C.
Topo Swope as Stoned Girl
Scott Spencer as Stoned Guy
Rosemary Welden as Biker Girl
Jim Sherwood as Roadblock Cop
Robert Espinoza as Little Dragon
Eric Johnson as Little Dragon
Rachel Lawson as Little Dragon
Jason Sachs as Little Dragon
Elan Salberg as Little Dragon
Oryan Salberg as Little Dragon
Tim Speer as Little Dragon
Elliott Mason as Little Dragon
Sam Spira as Little Dragon
"Jigs" as Rufus

Production

Although most online sources list the film as being released in July 1980, the Petersen brothers, Chris (born in 1963), and Pat (born in 1966) appear to be notably younger than in their various other roles during that same year.  Indicated by their youthful appearance and hairstyles, the film appears to have been most likely filmed sometime between 1977 and 1978.

Originally released in 1980 as "The Little Dragons", the film was later released on VHS by Active Home Video in 1984 under the same title, but with the new tag line: "The karate kids to the rescue!" in order to take advantage of the popularity of the hit film The Karate Kid released that same year. The film was later re-released on VHS by Magnum Video in 1991, this time retitled as "Karate Kids U.S.A.".  Subsequent DVD releases in the U.K. and the U.S. used shortened versions of both titles, retitled simply as "Dragons" and "Karate Kids" using the tag line: "Before the Karate Kid, there was The Karate Kids!"; however, the most recent 2009 Music Video Distributors DVD has been released under the film's original title, "The Little Dragons" this time with the tag line: "Meet the REAL Karate Kids...".

Although intended to be a "family film", by the time of the first VHS release in 1984, some of the language used by the children in the film was deemed inappropriate for a young audience, and was "cleaned up" for the 1984 Active Home Video VHS release.  The Petersen brothers having grown too old to re-dub their childhood voices, the decision was made to simply remove the "offending" dialogue altogether, resulting in the actors' mouths moving, but without the audio.

References

External links 

 

1980 comedy films
1980 martial arts films
1980 films
1980s action comedy films
American action comedy films
American children's comedy films
American martial arts comedy films
Films directed by Curtis Hanson
Films scored by Ken Lauber
Karate films
1980s English-language films
1980s American films